Diaspora is a genus in the phylum Apicomplexa, first described by Leger in 1898.

Taxonomy

There is one species in this genus - Diaspora hydatidea. This species was isolated from a millipede (Polydesmus species)

This genus was created for those Eimeriidae whose oocysts are unknown but have sporocysts each containing a single sporozoite. As such it is poorly defined and may be revised in the future.

References

Apicomplexa genera